Petro Osypenko (Ukrainian - Петро Григорович Осипенко; born 14 May 1921, Dykivka, now in Kropyvnytskyi Raion, Kirovohrad Oblast, Ukraine; date of death unknown) was a Ukrainian Soviet politician and public prosecutor. From 1983 to 1990 he was the prosecutor general of the Ukrainian Soviet Socialist Republic (a role which at that time was subordinate to the Prosecutor General of the Soviet Union).

Sources
Депутати Верховної Ради УРСР. 11-е скликання — 1985 р.

External links
 Petro Osypenko. Handbook on history of the Communist Party and the Soviet Union 1898–1991.

1921 births
Prosecutors of the Ukrainian Soviet Socialist Republic
Possibly living people
People from Kirovohrad Oblast
People from Kremenchuk Governorate
Soviet military personnel of World War II from Ukraine
Tenth convocation members of the Verkhovna Rada of the Ukrainian Soviet Socialist Republic
Eleventh convocation members of the Verkhovna Rada of the Ukrainian Soviet Socialist Republic
Central Committee of the Communist Party of Ukraine (Soviet Union) members